The Rikspokalen is a motor rally that takes place in Örebro, Sweden. In the past, it was considered to be one of Europe's toughest rallies.

It was one of the first rallies held when sport continued after World War Two with an event held in 1946 that had 35 finishers. It was won by Olle Landbu in a DKW F8 Meisterklasse with Per-Frederik Cederbaum second in a Willys Jeep MB and Bengt Carlqvist in a Volvo PV53 third. It was not held again until 1949 when Rune Andersson took his 1939 Ford Anglia to victory. The Swedish lady driver Cecilia Koskill finished sixth in her Volkswagen 1100 in what was among the first appearances of the iconic "beetle" in a major rally.  Later winners included Saab drivers Rolf Mellde (1950), Erik Carlsson (1955 and 1956) and Carl-Magnus Skogh (1957, 1958, 1959, 1960 and 1961).

Roughly translated, the name means "State's Cup".

Overall results 1946-61

Rally competitions in Sweden